The UEFA Champions League Anthem, officially titled simply "Champions League", is the official anthem of the UEFA Champions League, written by English composer Tony Britten in 1992, and based on George Frideric Handel's Zadok the Priest. It was also the official anthem of the UEFA Women's Champions League from its creation in 2001 to the 2021 creation of an independent anthem. The complete anthem is about three minutes long, and has two short verses and the chorus. The lyrics are in UEFA's three official languages: English, French, and German. The chorus is set to the exclamations "  The champions!"

The anthem is played inside the stadium before the start of each UEFA Champions League match, in addition to the beginning and end of television broadcasts of the games. Special vocal versions of the anthem have been performed live at the UEFA Champions League Final. UEFA's official website states, "the anthem is now almost as iconic as the trophy."

Composition 
In 1991, UEFA instructed its commercial partner Television Event and Media Marketing (TEAM) to develop new ways of branding the European Cup (which would be renamed the UEFA Champions League in 1992). This process resulted in the Champions League's anthem, as well as its "starball" logo and distinctive house colours.

The anthem was written by English composer Tony Britten in 1992, adapted from George Frideric Händel's anthem Zadok the Priest, which is traditionally performed at the coronation of British monarchs. In a 2013 newspaper interview, Britten stated that "I had a commercials agent and they approached me to write something anthemic and because it was just after The Three Tenors at the World Cup in Italy so classical music was all the rage. Hooliganism was a major, major problem and UEFA wanted to take the game into a completely different area altogether. There's a rising string phase which I pinched from Handel and then I wrote my own tune. It has a kind of Handelian feel to it but I like to think it's not a total rip-off." The composing process took "just a matter of days". Britten also mentioned that he does not own the rights to the anthem, which are retained by UEFA, but he receives royalties when it is used.

For the recording used in television transmissions of UEFA Champions League matches and events, the piece was performed by London's Royal Philharmonic Orchestra and sung by the Academy of St Martin in the Fields Chorus. The chorus is in UEFA's three official languages: English, French, and German.

Anthony King writes:

Lyrics

Uses 

The anthem's chorus is played before each UEFA Champions League game as the two teams are lined up, as well as at the beginning and end of television broadcasts of the matches, and when the winning team lifted the trophy after the final. Special vocal versions have been performed live at the Champions League Final with lyrics in other languages, changing over to the host country's language for the chorus. These versions were performed by Andrea Bocelli (Italian) (Rome 2009, Milan 2016 and Cardiff 2017), Juan Diego Flórez (Spanish) (Madrid 2010), All Angels (Wembley 2011), Jonas Kaufmann and David Garrett (Munich 2012), Mariza (Lisbon 2014, unlike the previous final performers, Mariza sang the main lyric of the anthem), and Nina Maria Fischer and Manuel Gomez Ruiz (Berlin 2015). In the 2013 final at Wembley Stadium, the chorus was played twice. In the 2018 and 2019 finals, held in Kyiv and Madrid respectively, the instrumental version of the chorus was played, by 2Cellos (2018) and Asturia Girls (2019), while the 2020 and 2021 finals used the pre-recorded anthem's chorus instead, without any live performances due to the COVID-19 pandemic. The 2022 final similarly used a standard pre-recorded version of the anthem.

The complete anthem is about three minutes long, and has two short verses and the chorus. In addition to the anthem, there is also entrance music, which contains parts of the anthem itself, which is played as teams enter the field. The anthem has been released commercially in its original version on iTunes and Spotify with the title of Champions League Theme. Also, the Academy of St Martin in the Fields chorus can be heard singing the influential piece "Zadok the Priest" on the 2002 album World Soccer Anthems. In 2018, composer Hans Zimmer remixed the anthem with rapper Vince Staples for EA Sports' FIFA video game FIFA 19, with it also featuring in the game's reveal trailer.

See also 

 UEFA Europa League Anthem

References

External links 
UEFA Champions League anthem on the UEFA home page

UEFA music
Anthem
Association football songs and chants
Association football anthems
Association football events official songs and anthems
Anthems of organizations
Sports television theme songs
Macaronic songs
1992 songs